Greece competed at the 1996 Summer Olympics in Atlanta, United States. Greek athletes have competed in every Summer Olympic Games. 121 competitors, 87 men and 34 women, took part in 94 events in 18 sports.

Medalists
Greece finished in 16th position in the final medal rankings, with four gold medals and four silver medals.

Gold
 Ioannis Melissanidis — Gymnastics, Men's Floor Exercises
 Nikolaos Kaklamanakis — Sailing, Men's Sailboard (Mistral)
 Pyrros Dimas — Weightlifting, Men's Light Heavyweight (83 kg)
 Kakhi Kakhiashvili — Weightlifting, Men's Heavyweight (99 kg)

Silver 
 Niki Bakogianni — Athletics, Women's High Jump
 Leonidas Sampanis — Weightlifting, Men's Bantamweight (59 kg)
 Valerios Leonidis — Weightlifting, Men's Featherweight (64 kg)
 Leonidas Kokas — Weightlifting, Men's Middle Heavyweight (91 kg)

Athletics

Men's Long Jump
 Spyridon Vasdekis
 Qualification — 7.98m (→ did not advance)

 Kostas Koukodimos
 Qualification — 7.82m (→ did not advance)

Men's Marathon
 Spyros Andriopoulos — 2:19.41 (→ 36th place)

Men's Hammer Throw 
 Alexandros Papadimitriou
 Qualification — 74.46m (→ did not advance)

 Hristos Polihroniou
 Qualification — NM (→ did not advance)

Women's High Jump
 Niki Bakogianni
 Qualification — 1.93m
 Final — 2.03m (→  Silver Medal)

Women's Long Jump 
 Niki Xanthou
 Qualification — 6.60m
 Final — 6.97m (→ 4th place)

 Voula Patoulidou
 Qualification — 6.58m
 Final — 6.37m (→ 11th place)

Women's Discus Throw 
 Styliani Tsikouna
 Qualification — 56.66m (→ did not advance)

 Anastasia Kelesidou
 Qualification — 59.60m (→ did not advance)

 Ekaterini Voggoli
 Qualification — 58.70m (→ did not advance)

Women's Triple Jump
 Olga Vasdeki
 Qualification — 14.48m
 Final — 14.44m (→ 6th place)

Women's Marathon
 Maria Polizou — 2:41.33 (→ 42nd place)

Basketball

Men's tournament

Preliminary round

Quarterfinals

5–8th Place classification match

5th Place match

Boxing

Men's Bantamweight (– 54 kg)
Agathagelos Tsiripidis
 First Round — Lost to Abdelaziz Boulehia (Algeria) on points (6-10)

Men's Featherweight (– 57 kg)
Tigran Ouzlian
 First Round — Bye
 Second Round — Lost to Ramaz Paliani (Russia), 2-27

Cycling

Diving

Men's 3m Springboard
Nikolaos Siranidis
 Preliminary Heat — 316.50 (→ did not advance, 26th place)

Fencing

One female fencer represented Greece in 1996.

Women's épée
 Niki-Katerina Sidiropoulou

Gymnastics

Judo

Charalampos Papaioannou
7th place, heavy weight

Rhythmic gymnastics

Rowing

Sailing

Men

Women

Open

Shooting

Swimming

Men's 50m Freestyle
 George Giziotis
 Heat – 23.56 (→ did not advance, 34th place)

Men's 100m Freestyle
 George Giziotis
 Heat – 52.04 (→ did not advance, 46th place)

Men's 200m Freestyle
 Dimitris Manganas
 Heat – 1:53.84 (→ did not advance, 30th place)

Men's 400m Freestyle
 Dimitris Manganas
 Heat – 3:54.85
 B-Final – 3:57.39 (→ did not advance, 16th place)

Men's 100m Backstroke
 Panagiotis Adamidis
 Heat – 58.12 (→ did not advance, 38th place)

Men's 100m Butterfly
 Georgios Popotas
 Heat – 56.16 (→ did not advance, 43rd place)

Men's 200m Butterfly
 Georgios Popotas
 Heat – 2:06.00 (→ did not advance, 40th place)

Women's 100m Freestyle
 Antonia Mahaira
 Heat – 57.92 (→ did not advance, 31st place)

Women's 200m Freestyle
 Antonia Mahaira
 Heat – 2:03.21
 B-Final – 2:03.19 (→ 14th place)

Women's 400m Freestyle
 Antonia Mahaira
 Heat – 4:24.05 (→ did not advance, 34th place)

Women's 100m Backstroke
 Katerina Klepkou
 Heat – 1:05.94 (→ did not advance, 27th place)

Women's 200m Backstroke
 Katerina Klepkou
 Heat – 2:22.83 (→ did not advance, 31st place)

Women's 100m Butterfly
 Marina Karystinou
 Heat – 1:05.05 (→ did not advance, 40th place)

Women's 200m Butterfly
 Marina Karystinou
 Heat – 2:20.57 (→ did not advance, 29th place)

Women's 200m Individual Medley
 Katerina Sarakatsani
 Heat – 2:19.74 (→ did not advance, 23rd place)

Women's 400m Individual Medley
 Katerina Sarakatsani
 Heat – 4:56.32 (→ did not advance, 25th place)

Women's 4 × 100 m Medley Relay
 Katerina Klepkou, Katerina Sarakatsani, Marina Karystinou, and Antonia Mahaira
 Heat – 4:24.80 (→ did not advance, 22nd place)

Table tennis

Tennis

Women's Singles Competition
 Christina Papadáki
 First round — Lost to Angélica Gavaldón (Mexico) 1-6 6-3 2-6

Water polo

Men's Team Competition
Preliminary Round (Group B)
  –  5-8
  –  7-9
  –  8-5
  –  8-10
  –  9-6
Quarter Finals
  –  8-12
Classification Matches
 5th/8th place:  –  7-6
 5th/6th place:  –  8-10 (→ Sixth place)

Team Roster
George Mavrotas
Anastasios Papanastasiou
Filippos Kaiafas
Evangelos Patras
Gerasimos Voltirakis
Theodoros Lorantos
Konstantinos Loudis
Georgios Afroudakis
Thomas Khatzis
Theodoros Khatzitheodorou
Georgios Psykhos
Simeon Georgaras
Theodoros Kalakonas

Weightlifting

Men's Light-Heavyweight (– 83 kg)
Pyrros Dimas
 Final — 180.0 + 212.5 = 392.5 (→  Gold Medal)

Wrestling

References

Nations at the 1996 Summer Olympics
1996 Summer Olympics
Summer Olympics